Huatai Securities is a securities firm in China which engages in the operation of large-scale comprehensive securities broking and trading services. The company was founded in 1991 and is headquartered in Nanjing, China.

History

Huatai Securities was established on 9 April 1991 in with a registered share capital of RMB 10 million. It was originally named Jiangsu Securities Company until it was renamed to Huatai Securities in 1999.

In 2008, Huatai Securities received approval from the China Securities Regulatory Commission to be a Qualified Domestic Institutional Investor.

On 26 February 2010, Huatai Securities was listed on the Shanghai Stock Exchange with the stock code of 601688.

On 1 June 2015, the H Shares of Huatai Securities were listed on the  Hong Kong Stock Exchange with the stock code of 6886.

In 2016, Huatai Securities acquired AssetMark, a wealth management technology provider from Aquiline Capital Partners and Genstar Capital,  for $780 million in cash.

On 17 June 2019, Global depository receipts of Huatai Securities were listed on London Stock Exchange with the stock code of HTSC.

Business areas 
The main businesses of Huatai Securities include wealth management, institutional services, investment management, and international business.

Wealth management 
Mainly securities brokerage and financial products sales. Platforms include Desktop PC and Mobile apps.

Institutional services 

 Investment banking (includes ECM, DCM, financial advisory etc.)
 Prime brokerage 
 Research and institutional sales (mainly Securities research as well as promoting and selling securities to Institutional Clients)
 Investment and trading (includes equity trading, FICC trading and OTC derivative transactions)

Investment management 
Mainly consists of providing asset management services to Financial institutions.

International business 
The international business covers various countries and regions such as Hong Kong and the United States. This is done through the subsidiary, Huatai International.

Principal subsidiaries 
As of 31 December 2021:

Major Shareholders 
As of 31 December 2021, the top ten substantial shareholders are as follows:

See also 
 Securities industry in China

References

External links
 Official site

Companies listed on the Shanghai Stock Exchange
Companies in the CSI 100 Index
Companies listed on the Hong Kong Stock Exchange
Financial services companies established in 1991
Companies based in Nanjing
Investment banks in China
Financial services companies of China
H shares
Companies listed on the London Stock Exchange